Claude-André Puget (22 June 1905, in Nice – 14 August 1975) was a 20th-century French playwright and screenwriter.

Theatre

Plays 
1932: La Ligne de cœur
1933: Valentin le Désossé
1937: Tourterelle
1938: Les Jours heureux
1938: Nuit et jour
1941: Échec à Don Juan, directed by Alice Cocea, Théâtre des Ambassadeurs, 19 December 
1944: Le Grand Poucet
1944: Un petit ange de rien du tout
1946: Le Saint Bernard, two-act comedy, directed by Pierre Fresnay, Théâtre des Bouffes-Parisiens, 3 October
1948: La Peine capitale
1949: Miss Mabel
1951: Le Roi de la fête
1954: Un nommé Judas
1957: Le Cœur volant
1963: Le Déjeuner de Louveciennes
1963: Le Roi de la fête
1969: On ne saurait penser à rien
1972: La Lumière noire
1973: Le Château perdu

Adaptations 
 1945: Le Printemps de la Saint Martin by Noël Coward, directed by Jean Meyer, Théâtre de la Potinière
 1977: Pygmalion by George Bernard Shaw, directed by Raymond Gérôme, Théâtre de Paris

Filmography 
 1941: Happy Days by Jean de Marguenat
 1942: Happy Days by Gianni Franciolini
 1960: The Hero of My Dreams by Arthur Maria Rabenalt

Screenwriter
 1930: Le Petit Chaperon rouge (songs)
 1934: Mauvaise Graine by Billy Wilder
 1936: Adventure in Paris by Marc Allégret
 1936: The Terrible Lovers by Marc Allégret
 1937: Woman of Malacca by Marc Allégret
 1941: Happy Days by Jean de Marguenat
 1943: Les Deux Timides by Yves Allégret
 1943: Lucrèce by Léo Joannon
 1945: Carmen by Christian-Jaque
 1950: Véronique by Robert Vernay
 1954: A Slice of Life (Tempi nostri)
 1959: Venetian Honeymoon by Alberto Cavalcanti

External links 
 Biographie détaillée on regietheatrale.com
 

20th-century French dramatists and playwrights
20th-century French screenwriters
1905 births
People from Nice
1975 deaths